Lokmanya Tilak Terminus - Lucknow Junction Superfast Express is a Superfast train of the Indian Railways connecting Lokmanya Tilak Terminus Kurla in Maharashtra and Lucknow Junction of Uttar Pradesh. It is currently being operated with 12107/12108 train numbers on tri-weekly basis.

Service

The 12107/Lokmanya Tilak Terminus - Lucknow Junction SF Express has an average speed of 62 km/hr and covers 1407 km in 22h 45m. The 12108/Lucknow Junction - Lokmanya Tilak Terminus SF Express has an average speed of 59 km/hr and covers 1407 km in 23h 50m.

Route and halts 

The important halts of the train are:

Coach composite

The train has standard LHB rakes with max speed of 110 kmph. The train consists of 24 coaches :

 1 AC II Tier
 3 AC III Tier
 13 Sleeper Coaches
 4 General
 1 Pantry Car
 2 Second-class Luggage/parcel van

Traction

Both trains are hauled by a Bhusawal Loco Shed based WAP-4 electric locomotive from Kurla to Lucknow and vice versa.

See also 

 Udyognagri Express
 Mumbai LTT - Habibganj Superfast Express
 Lashkar Express

Notes

External links 

 12107/Mumbai LTT - Lucknow Jn. SF Express
 12108/Lucknow Jn. - Mumbai LTT SF Express

References 

Passenger trains originating from Lucknow
Transport in Mumbai
Express trains in India
Rail transport in Maharashtra
Rail transport in Madhya Pradesh